Warmesberg railway station is a railway station in Altstätten, in the Swiss canton of St. Gallen. It is an intermediate stop on the  Altstätten–Gais line and is served by local trains only.

Services 
Warmesberg is served by the S24 of the St. Gallen S-Bahn:

 : hourly service between Gais and Altstätten Stadt.

References

External links 
 Warmesberg station on SBB

Railway stations in the canton of St. Gallen
Appenzell Railways stations
Altstätten